Arnold Williams may refer to:

 Arnold Williams (American politician), Governor of Idaho
 Arnold Williams (British politician), British businessman and Liberal politician
 Arnold Williams (cricketer), Welsh-born cricketer for New Zealand